Carnegie Hill Tower is a 32-story condominium building at 40 East 94th Street in the Upper East Side neighborhood of Manhattan in New York City.

The building was designed by Edward V. Giannasca on behalf of developers Frederick DeMatteis and Charles Shaw and completed in 1983. The building is known for its waterfall that extends to 93rd Street and extensively landscaped mews.

References

External links
 
 Carnegie Hill Tower Profile - CityRealty

Privately owned public spaces
Residential buildings completed in 1983
Residential buildings in Manhattan
Residential condominiums in New York City
Upper East Side